Hedong Township is a township of Qu County in northeastern Sichuan province, China, located  northeast of the county seat. The township derives its name from the fact that is located on the southeast (left) bank of the Qu River. , it has one residential community and five villages under its administration.

References 

Township-level divisions of Sichuan
Qu County